The final of the Men's 800 metres event at the 2003 Pan American Games took place on Wednesday August 6, 2003, with the heats staged a day earlier. The Moroccan-born Canadian Achraf Tadili ran a very quick finish to win in a record time of 1:45.05, faster than the previous Pan Am Record (1:45.38) set by USA’s Johnny Gray four years earlier in Winnipeg. Brazil’s Osmar dos Santos (1:45.64) could not respond to his rival’s late surge and finished second, ahead of his compatriot Fabiano Peçanha (1:46.39).

Medalists

Records

Results

See also
2003 World Championships in Athletics – Men's 800 metres
Athletics at the 2004 Summer Olympics – Men's 800 metres

References
Results
usatf

800 metres, Men's
2003